The 1992–93 season was Heart of Midlothian F.C.'s 10th consecutive season of play in the Scottish Premier Division. Hearts also competed in the UEFA Cup, Scottish Cup & the Scottish League Cup.

Managers

Hearts had two managers over the course of the season. Joe Jordan was sacked on 3 May after three years following a string of bad results including a 6–0 defeat by Falkirk. Sandy Clark took over as caretaker manager for the rest of the season.

Fixtures

Friendlies

Uefa Cup

League Cup

Scottish Cup

Scottish Premier Division

Scottish Premier Division table

Stats

Squad information

|}

Scorers

See also
List of Heart of Midlothian F.C. seasons

References

1992-93

External links
Official Club website

1993-94
Heart of Midlothian